Saladin (An-Nasir Salah ad-Din Yusuf ibn Ayyub, 1137–1193), was the first sultan of Egypt and Syria and founder of the Ayyubid dynasty.

Saladin, Salah el-Din, Salah ad-Din or variant spellings (Arabic: صلاح الدين) may also refer to:

Arts, entertainment and media
 Salladin the Victorious, or Al Nasser Salah Ad-Din, a 1963 epic Egyptian film 
 Saladin: The Animated Series, a TV series 
 Statue of Saladin, in Damascus, Syria
 Saladin Chamcha, a protagonist in The Satanic Verses Saladin Paracelsus de Lambertine Evagne von Smith, full name of the fictional character Button-Bright
 Ghazi Salahuddin, 1939 Indian film by I. A. Hafesjee, starring Ghulam Mohammed as the sultan

People
 Salah ad-Din (name), including a list of all people with variants of the name
 William Stewart Ross (1844–1906), a Scottish writer and publisher, pseudonym Saladin

Places
 Salaheddine District, in Aleppo, Syria
 Saladin Governorate, in Iraq 
 Citadel of Salah Ed-Din, northwest Syria

Other uses
 Alvis Saladin, an armoured car
 Saladin (barque), a 19th century British ship
 Salahaddin FC, an Iraqi football team 
 Salahaddin University-Erbil in Kurdistan, Iraq
 , a ferry, sank in Bangladesh 2002
 , a ship launched as SS Atchison Victory''

See also

 Selahattin, a related Turkish given name